Paulus Huỳnh Tịnh Của or Paulus Huình Tịnh Của (1834-1907) was a Vietnamese Confucian scholar who studied and translated European works, classical Chinese works and Nôm works into Quốc Ngữ - modern romanized Vietnamese. Like Trương Vĩnh Ký, Của was a Confucian scholar who converted to Catholicism. He worked for the French colonial government of Cochinchina in the translation of judicial papers.

References

1834 births
1907 deaths
People from Bà Rịa-Vũng Tàu Province
Vietnamese Roman Catholics